The red-headed lovebird (Agapornis pullarius) also known as the red-faced lovebird is a member of the genus Agapornis, a group commonly known as lovebirds. Like other lovebirds it is native to Africa.

Taxonomy
The red-headed lovebird was formally described in 1758 by the Swedish naturalist Carl Linnaeus in the tenth edition of his Systema Naturae. He placed it with all the other parrots in the genus Psittacus and coined the binomial name Psittacus pullarius. The type locality is Ghana. The red-headed lovebird is now one of nine species placed in the genus Agapornis that was introduced in 1836 by the English naturalist Prideaux John Selby. The genus name combines the Ancient Greek αγάπη agape meaning "love" and όρνις ornis meaning "bird". The specific epithet pullarius is from Latin and means "of young birds" (pullus means "chick").

Two subspecies are recognised:
 A. p. pullarius (Linnaeus, 1758) – Guinea and Sierra Leone to Sudan, DR Congo and Angola
 A. p. ugandae Neumann, 1908 – west Ethiopia to east DR Congo and northwest Tanzania

Description
The red-headed lovebird is a 15 cm (6 inches) long, mostly green parrot. It has a well demarcated red area on its head extending from the top of the beak, over the forehead to mid-crown, and extending to the left and right up to the eyelid margins. It has grey feet. The underside of the wings is a lighter green. The female has orange head colouring, which is less well demarcated than the male's red head.  The adult male has a red beak while the female's is a paler red.

Distribution and habitat
It has a patchy distribution across the African tropical rainforest.

Breeding
It makes its nest in a termites nest usually in a tree or sometimes on the ground.

Aviculture
It is a very nervous species.

References

External links

 Pullaria.info

red-headed lovebird
Birds of the African tropical rainforest
red-headed lovebird
red-headed lovebird